The  trains were DC electric commuter trains operated by Japanese National Railways (JNR), and served as the basis for the 101 series. The 72 series included the main production batch of 490 vehicles as well as 667 former 63 series cars converted into 72 series between 1953 and 1955. The last remaining trains were withdrawn in 1985, although some cars which were converted into mail coaches and experimental vehicles continued to remain in service until 1996. Most 72 series trains were converted to four-car 72-970 series trains, with the body based on the 103 series with the raised cab. The 72-970 series remained in service until 1985 when they were converted to 103-3000 series for the Kawagoe Line.

Variants
 72 series - introduced in 1954, produced from 1952 to 1958
 72-970 series - later converted to 103-3000 series
 Kumoha 73 - cab car (about 330 vehicles built)

Operations
72 series trains were in service on the Ome Line from 1961 until 1978, and on the Kabe Line from 1976 until 1984.  trains were in service on the Ome Line, Nambu Line, Yokohama Line, and Tsurumi Line.

Preserved examples
 KuMoHa 73383: Privately preserved in Saeki, Hiroshima. Restored in October 2013, awaiting move to Yanahara Fureai Mine Park.
 KuMoYa 90005: Stored at JR Central Hamamatsu Depot.
 KuMoYa 90801 (partial): Preserved at the JR East Railway Museum in Saitama.
 KuMoNi 83006: Used at the Toshiba factory in Fuchu, Tokyo.

References

Train-related introductions in 1954
Electric multiple units of Japan
Kawasaki multiple units
Hitachi multiple units
Kinki Sharyo multiple units
Nippon Sharyo multiple units
1500 V DC multiple units of Japan
Tokyu Car multiple units
Kisha Seizo multiple units
Teikoku Sharyo rolling stock